Wang Liyan (born 1962) is a lieutenant general in the People's Liberation Army of China.

He is an alternate member of the 20th Central Committee of the Chinese Communist Party.

Biography
Wang was born in 1962.

He once served as deputy director of the Headquarters of the Second Artillery Force (now People's Liberation Army Rocket Force) and dean of the NCO Vocational and Technical Education School of the Second Artillery Force Engineering University. 

He became deputy chief engineer of the 54th Base of the Second Artillery Force in 2012, he remained in that position until July 2014, when he was appointed deputy chief of staff of the South China Sea Fleet.

He was promoted to the rank of major general (shaojiang) in December 2013 and lieutenant general (zhongjiang) in August 2021.

References

1962 births
Living people
People's Liberation Army generals
Chinese politicians
Chinese Communist Party politicians
Alternate members of the 20th Central Committee of the Chinese Communist Party